Ferdinand Maximilian II of Isenburg-Wächtersbach was a German count of Isenburg-Wächtersbach from 1703 to 1755. The county itself  lasted from 1673 to 1806 in the central Holy Roman Empire, until it was mediated to Isenberg.

Ancestry

References

Counts of Isenburg-Wächtersbach
1692 births
1755 deaths